Ture Isberg (23 April 1900 – 3 November 1989) was a Swedish footballer who played as a forward.

References

Association football forwards
Swedish footballers
Allsvenskan players
Malmö FF players
1900 births
1989 deaths